Musese Airport  is a grass airstrip running alongside the N20 road at the hamlet of Musese, about  southeast of Luebo, in Kasaï Province, Democratic Republic of the Congo.

See also

Transport in the Democratic Republic of the Congo
List of airports in the Democratic Republic of the Congo

References

External links
 OpenStreetMap - Musese
 FallingRain - Musese Airport
 HERE Maps - Musese
 OurAirports - Musese
 

Airports in Kasaï Province